The 1974 Atlanta Falcons season was the franchise's ninth year in the National Football League (NFL). After coming close to their maiden postseason appearance the previous season and finishing with a best-to-date 9–5 record despite an upset loss to the Cardinals, the Falcons traded star cornerback Ken Reaves to the archrival New Orleans Saints to obtain in-demand guard Royce Smith, a former Georgia Bulldogs All-American, in a widely criticized move (Reaves played only five games for New Orleans before he was cut; he signed with St. Louis, where he remained through his retirement in 1978). During the strike-affected pre-season, they beat the Eagles 23 to 7 in a rain-soaked match, before losing to the Raiders, 28–16. Soon afterwards the Falcons lost key offensive tackle Bill Sandeman for the entire season with a slipped disc in his back.

Along with a form lapse from quarterback Bob Lee and an injury to running back Dave Hampton, this destroyed the Falcons’ offense. The 1974 Falcons scored 111 points with a mere twelve touchdowns, the lowest total in franchise history, and the second lowest by any team in a fourteen-game NFL season after the infamous “Zero Gang” offense of the 1977 Buccaneers who were shut out six times in fourteen games. Their failure to score more than seventeen points in any game has been equalled since only by the infamous offense of the 1992 Seahawks.

The Falcons sacked long-serving head coach Norman van Brocklin after being thrashed by the Miami Dolphins and having heard demands from fans to make that move. Three of his successors have suffered the same humiliation in the middle of a season: Marion Campbell (1976 and 1989), Dan Reeves (2003) and Dan Quinn (2020), and Bobby Petrino quit with three games remaining in 2007.

The 1974 Falcons suffered through the humiliation of being the first Falcons team to be swept by the Saints since the teams became division rivals with the AFL-NFL merger. The Saints entered the season 1–9 all-time vs. the Falcons, with that win coming in the teams' first meeting in 1967. New Orleans did not sweep Atlanta again until 1983.

Offseason

NFL Draft

Personnel

Staff

Roster

Regular season

Schedule

Season summary

Week 4

Standings

References

External links
 1974 Atlanta Falcons at Pro-Football-Reference.com

Atlanta Falcons
Atlanta Falcons seasons
Atlanta